The molecular formula C15H20N2O2 may refer to:

 4-AcO-MET, or metacetin
 5,6-MDO-MiPT
 Fenspiride
 Sazetidine A (AMOP-H-OH)

Molecular formulas